The 1991 Motorcraft Formula Ford Driver to Europe Series was an Australian motor racing competition for Formula Ford cars.
It was the 22nd Australian national series for Formula Fords.

The series was won by Troy Dunstan driving a Van Diemen RF91.

Schedule
The series was contested over seven rounds with one race per round.

Points system
Series points were awarded on a 20-15-12-10-8-6-4-3-2-1 basis for the first ten positions at each round.

Standings

Notes & references

External links
 Images from Symmons Plains Raceway - 10 March 1991 (including Motorcraft Formula Ford Driver to Europe Series images on pages 2 & 3), oldmotorsportphotos.com.au

Motorcraft Formula Ford
Australian Formula Ford Series